Lindsay Dubue (born July 23, 1999) is a Canadian curler from Ottawa, Ontario. She currently plays second on Team Clancy Grandy.

Career
Dubue played in three Canadian Junior Curling Championships during her junior career in 2017, 2018 and 2020. In 2017, playing second for Hailey Armstrong, she won the silver medal after losing the final Alberta's Kristen Streifel. In both 2018 and 2020, she missed the playoffs playing for Emma Wallingford and Kira Brunton respectively. Also during the 2019–20 season, Team Brunton defeated Cathy Auld in the final of the 2019 Stu Sells Toronto Tankard on the World Curling Tour.

During the 2019–20 season, Dubue got to spare for Joanne Courtney on the Rachel Homan rink during the 2019 AMJ Campbell Shorty Jenkins Classic. After a 4–0 record and a win in the quarterfinals, they lost in the semifinal to Tracy Fleury, eliminating them from the tournament.

Dubue joined the Emily Deschenes rink at second for the 2020–21 season. In just their second event together, they defeated the Jennifer Jones rink 6–4 in a round robin game and finished third for the event.

The following season, Dubue moved to British Columbia and joined the Kayla MacMillan rink at second with Jody Maskiewich at third and Sarah Loken at lead. On the tour, the team reached the final of the DeKalb Superspiel where they lost to Amber Holland. At the 2022 British Columbia Scotties Tournament of Hearts, the team qualified for the playoffs through the A Event, defeating defending champions Corryn Brown in the process. They then beat Mary-Anne Arsenault in the 1 vs. 2 game but lost to them in the provincial final 8–6, finishing in second place. They ended the season at the Best of the West event where they reached the semifinals.

For the 2022–23 season, the team added Clancy Grandy as their new skip. In their first event, they finished runner-up to Silvana Tirinzoni at the Summer Series.

Personal life
Dubue took human kinetics at the University of Ottawa. She currently works as a physiotherapy assistant with HW Health Sport Science Rehab & Performance.

Teams

References

External links

1999 births
Canadian women curlers
Living people
Curlers from Ottawa
Laurentian University alumni